The third season of the American animated television series SpongeBob SquarePants, created by Stephen Hillenburg, aired on Nickelodeon from October 5, 2001, to October 11, 2004, and consists of 20 half-hour episodes. The series chronicles the exploits and adventures of the title character and his various friends in the fictional underwater city of Bikini Bottom. The season was executive produced by series creator Hillenburg, who also acted as the showrunner. Hillenburg halted production on the show to work on the 2004 film adaptation of the series, The SpongeBob SquarePants Movie. After production on the film, Hillenburg resigned from the show as its showrunner, and appointed staff writer, Paul Tibbitt, to overtake the position. Season three was originally set to be the final season of the series, with the film acting as a series finale, but the success prevented the series from ending, leading to a fourth season.

The season received acclaim from media critics and fans. During its run, SpongeBob SquarePants became (and remains) the highest rated children's show on cable, with over 50 million viewers a month. The show received several recognitions, including its nomination at the Primetime Emmy Awards for Outstanding Children's Program. The episodes "New Student Starfish" and "Clams" were nominated for Outstanding Animated Program (for Programming Less Than One Hour) category, while the entry "SpongeBob B.C. (Ugh)" was also nominated for the same category. The season was also the first time the show received a nomination at the Kids' Choice Awards and won. It won the 2003 Kids' Choice Awards for Favorite Cartoon, and also won the following year's Kids' Choice Award for the same category. Celebrities—including Justin Timberlake, Kelly Osbourne, Britney Spears, Bruce Willis, Noel Gallagher, Dr. Dre, and Mike Myers—have been reported to be fans of the show.

Several compilation DVDs that contained episodes from the season were released. The SpongeBob SquarePants: The Complete 3rd Season DVD was released in Region 1 on September 27, 2005, Region 2 on December 3, 2007, and Region 4 on November 8, 2007.

Production
The season aired on Nickelodeon, which is owned by Viacom, and was produced by United Plankton Pictures and Nickelodeon Animation Studio. The season's executive producer was series creator Stephen Hillenburg, who also functioned as the showrunner. During production of the previous season, Nickelodeon already picked up a third season for SpongeBob SquarePants on September 20, 2000, due to the show's high ratings across basic cable television. It premiered more than a year later, on October 5, 2001.

In 2002, Hillenburg and the show's staff members decided to stop making episodes to work on the 2004 film The SpongeBob SquarePants Movie, after completing production of the third season. As a result, the show went into a "self-imposed" two-year hiatus on television. During the break, Nickelodeon expanded the programming for the third season to cover the delay, however, according to Nickelodeon executive Eric Coleman, "there certainly was a delay and a built-up demand." Nickelodeon announced nine "as-yet-unaired" (full) episodes would be shown. "The Sponge Who Could Fly" first aired during a two-hour "Sponge"-a-thon, while the other eight were broadcast subsequently.

Once the production on the film was completed, Hillenburg wanted to end the series "so the show wouldn't jump the shark", but Nickelodeon wanted to produce more episodes. Hillenburg said "Well, there was concern when we did the movie [in 2004] that the show had peaked. There were concerns among executives at Nickelodeon." Hillenburg resigned as the series' showrunner, and appointed Paul Tibbitt, who previously served as the show's supervising producer, writer, director, and storyboard artist, to overtake the role. Hillenburg considered Tibbitt one of his favorite members of the show's crew, and "totally trusted him." Tibbitt still holds the showrunner position and also functions as an executive producer. Hillenburg no longer wrote or directly ran the show on a day-to-day basis, but reviewed each episode and delivered suggestions. He said "I figure when I'm pretty old I can still paint[...] I don't know about running shows." Tom Kenny, Bill Fagerbakke, and the rest of the crew confirmed they had completed four new episodes for broadcast on Nickelodeon in early 2005, and planned to finish about 20 total for the then-fourth season.

Animation was handled overseas in South Korea at Rough Draft Studios. Animation directors credited with episodes in the third season included Sean Dempsey, Andrew Overtoom, Frank Weiss, and Tom Yasumi. Episodes were written by a team of writers, which consisted of Walt Dohrn, C.H. Greenblatt, Sam Henderson, Kaz, Jay Lender, Joe Liss (The Great Snail Race only), Mark O'Hare, Kent Osborne, Aaron Springer, Paul Tibbitt, and Merriwether Williams. The season was storyboarded by Zeus Cervas, Dohrn, Greenblatt, Henderson, Kaz, Chuck Klein, Carson Kugler, Lender, Heather Martinez, Caleb Meurer, O'Hare, Osborne, Dan Povenmire, William Reiss, Mike Roth, Springer, Tibbitt, and Wiese.

Cast

The third season featured Tom Kenny as the voice of the title character SpongeBob SquarePants and his pet snail Gary. SpongeBob's best friend, a starfish named Patrick Star, was voiced by Bill Fagerbakke, while Rodger Bumpass played the voice of Squidward Tentacles, an arrogant and ill-tempered octopus. Other members of the cast were Clancy Brown as Mr. Krabs, a miserly crab obsessed with money and SpongeBob's boss at the Krusty Krab; Mr. Lawrence as Plankton, a small green copepod and Mr. Krabs' business rival; Jill Talley as Karen, Plankton's sentient computer sidekick; Carolyn Lawrence as Sandy Cheeks, a squirrel from Texas; Mary Jo Catlett as Mrs. Puff, SpongeBob's boating school teacher; and Lori Alan as Pearl, a teenage whale who is Mr. Krabs' daughter.

In addition to the regular cast members, episodes feature guest voices from many ranges of professions, including actors and musicians. Former McHale's Navy actors Ernest Borgnine and Tim Conway returned in the episode "Mermaid Man and Barnacle Boy IV", reprising their roles as Mermaid Man and Barnacle Boy, respectively. Borgnine and Conway reappeared in the episode "Mermaid Man and Barnacle Boy V", which was also guest starred by John Rhys-Davies as Man Ray, and Martin Olson as the Chief. Brian Doyle-Murray reprised his role as the Flying Dutchman for "Born Again Krabs". Radio disc jockey Rodney Bingenheimer guest starred in the episode "Krab Borg" as the DJ. In "Party Pooper Pants", American rock band the Cramps lead vocalist Lux Interior performed the voice of the lead singer of the all-bird rock band called the Bird Brains. Kevin Michael Richardson also appeared in the live action segments of the episode as King Neptune. Various other characters were voiced by Dee Bradley Baker, Steve Kehela, Frank Welker, and Thomas F. Wilson.

Reception
During its third season, SpongeBob SquarePants passed Rugrats and earned the title of being the highest rated children's show on cable, with a 6.7 rating and 2.2 million kids 2 to 11 in the second quarter of 2002, up 22% over 2001. Forbes called the show "a $1 billion honeypot," and said the show is "almost single-handedly responsible for making Viacom's Nickelodeon the most-watched cable channel during the day and the second most popular during prime time." It was also reported that of the 50 million viewers who watch it every month, 20 million are adults.

The season was acclaimed by media critics and fans. In 2002, the show itself was nominated at the Primetime Emmy Awards for Outstanding Children's Program. Its episodes "New Student Starfish" and "Clams" were nominated for Outstanding Animated Program (for Programming Less Than One Hour) category, while the entry "Ugh" was also nominated for the same category. The show also won the Television Critics Association Awards for Outstanding Achievement in Youth Programming. The season was also the first time the show received a nomination at the Kids' Choice Awards and won. In 2003, the show won the 2003 Kids' Choice Awards for Favorite Cartoon, and also won the succeeding year's Kids' Choice Award for the same category. At the 2003 Golden Reel Awards, the show won Best Sound Editing in Television Animation and Best Sound Editing in Television Animation — Music categories for the episodes "Nasty Patty"/"Idiot Box" and "Wet Painters"/"Krusty Krab Training Video", respectively. The episodes "The Great Snail Race" and "Mid-Life Crustacean" won at the 2004 Golden Reel Awards for "Best Sound Editing in Television Animation — Music", while the episode "Mid-Life Crustacean" itself received a nomination for "Best Sound Editing in Television Animation".

In his review for the DVD Verdict, Bryan Pope wrote that "the show's charm lies in the vast world of nautical nonsense" and that the show is "a world of aquanaut squirrels, clarinet-playing squids, underwater campfires, retired superheroes, plankton obsessed with world domination, and the most head-scratching family units I've ever come across (a crab and a puffer fish are parents to a teenage whale, while pint-sized Plankton is married to a no-nonsense computer named Karen)." Pope pointed out that the season "remains the high point for the series" as it had produced "classic" episodes such as "No Weenies Allowed", "SpongeBob Meets the Strangler", and "Krusty Krab Training Video". However, Pope described "The Lost Episode" as a "misstep" that "veers too far away from Bikini Bottom and into unfunny live-action territory." Furthermore, various celebrities—including Justin Timberlake, Kelly Osbourne, Britney Spears, Bruce Willis, Noel Gallagher, rapper Dr. Dre, and Mike Myers—were reported to be fans of the show. In 2002, fans of the show formed a "new religion"—the Church of SpongeBob SquarePants. The organization has more than 700 members. Its manifesto said it wanted to push "simple things like having fun and using your imagination", and even offered study courses on the show. A Nickelodeon spokesman said "SpongeBob's appeal is extraordinary."

The popularity of SpongeBob translated well into sales figures. In 2002, SpongeBob SquarePants dolls sold at a rate of 75,000 per week, which was faster than Tickle Me Elmo dolls were selling at the time. SpongeBob has gained popularity in Japan, specifically with Japanese women. Nickelodeon's parent company Viacom purposefully targeted marketing at women in the country as a method of the SpongeBob SquarePants brand. Skeptics initially doubted that SpongeBob could be popular in Japan as the character's design is very different from already popular designs for Hello Kitty and Pikachu. Nickelodeon also expanded the merchandising of the show, bringing it around $500 million revenue. It was reported that SpongeBob-themed goods were the best-selling character merchandise at Hot Topic store at Park City Center. T-shirts, pillows, shoelaces, pins, sunglasses, and air fresheners were sold "extremely well if they have SpongeBob's likeness on them," said Erin Aguirre, lead sales associate of Hot Topic. He added "[Customers] come in and they just jump right into it. "Did you see last week's episode?' They totally talk all about it, just that it's funny, that it's hilarious."

Moreover, the gay community had embraced the show, according to BBC Online. The Wall Street Journal also raised questions about SpongeBob and Patrick in a recent article that pointed up the show's popularity in the gay community. Tom Kenny, in response to the article, said "[I] felt the insinuation was a stretch." Kenny said "I had heard that gay viewers enjoy the show in the same way that lots of people—college students, parents and children—like the show[...] I thought it was rather silly to hang an entire article on that. I don't think it's a case of it being a gay-friendly show—It's a human-being-friendly show. They're all welcome." Hillenburg responded about the character's sexual orientation and stated that he is "[a] cheerful character [but] is not gay." He clarified that he considers the character to be "almost asexual". The show's popularity among gay men would become controversial. In 2005, a promotional video, which showed SpongeBob along with other characters from children's shows singing together to promote diversity and tolerance, was attacked by an evangelical group in the United States because they saw SpongeBob being used as an "advocate for homosexuality". James Dobson of Focus on the Family accused the makers of the video of "promoting homosexuality due to a pro-tolerance group sponsoring the video". After Dobson made the comments, Hillenburg repeated this assertion that sexual preference was never considered during the creation of the show. Tom Kenny and other production members were shocked and surprised that such an issue had arisen. Dobson later asserted that his comments were taken out of context and that his original complaints were not with SpongeBob, the video, or any of the characters in the video but with the organization that sponsored the video, We Are Family Foundation. Dobson indicated that the We Are Family Foundation posted pro-homosexual material on their website, but later removed it.

Episodes

The episodes are ordered below according to Nickelodeon's packaging order, and not their original production or broadcast order.

DVD release
The DVD boxset for season three was released by Paramount Home Entertainment and Nickelodeon in the United States and Canada on September 27, 2005, almost a year after the season had completed broadcast on television. The DVD release features bonus materials including the pilot episode "Help Wanted" and featurettes.

Notes

References

Bibliography

External links

Season 3 at Metacritic

2001 American television seasons
2002 American television seasons
2003 American television seasons
2004 American television seasons
SpongeBob SquarePants seasons